Multan Cantonment Railway Station (often abbreviated as Multan Cantt) is the principal railway station in the city of Multan, Punjab province of Pakistan. It is a major railway station of Pakistan Railways located on Karachi-Peshawar Railway Line.

Facilities
The station is staffed and has advance and current reservation offices. Food stalls are also located on it platforms.

Services
The following trains originate/stop at Multan Cantonment station:

See also
 List of railway stations in Pakistan
 Pakistan Railways

References

Transport in Multan
Railway stations in Multan District